The 2015 Oceania Handball Champions Cup was held in Sydney, Australia from 6 to 8 June 2015. This was organised by the Oceania Handball Federation and featured two teams from Australia and one from New Caledonia.

The winner was Sydney University, retaining their title and will represent Oceania in the 2015 IHF Super Globe.

Results

Round Robin Stage

Final

Final standings

References

Oceania Handball Champions Cup
2015 in handball
2015 in Australian sport
2015 Oceania Handball Champions Cup